The Dallara SF14 is a single-seater open-wheel chassis made by Italian manufacturer Dallara for the Super Formula series in Japan. It was introduced for the 2014 season and used until the 2018 season. For the 2019 season, the chassis was replaced by the Dallara SF19. It was the sole chassis used in Super Formula during these seasons, though engine competition between Honda and Toyota resulted in performance differences between the Honda and Toyota powered versions.

References

External links
 About Super Formula - from Super Formula official website in 
 Super Formula - from Dallara official website in 

SF14
Open wheel racing cars
Super Formula cars